Mount Beazley is a mountain (2,410 m) surmounting the north extremity of the California Plateau. Mapped by United States Geological Survey (USGS) from ground surveys and U.S. Navy air photos, 1960–63. Named by Advisory Committee on Antarctic Names (US-ACAN) for Lieutenant Robert M. Beazley, MC, U.S. Navy, officer in charge of the South Pole Station winter party, 1965.

Mountains of Marie Byrd Land